The Chinese Ambassador to Nauru was the official representative of the People's Republic of China to the Republic of Nauru between 2002 and 2005.

List of representatives

References

Nauru
China
Ambassadors